Jennifer 8. Lee () (born March 15, 1976) is an American journalist who previously worked for The New York Times. She is also the co-founder and president of the literary studio Plympton, as well as a producer on The Search for General Tso, which premiered at the 2014 Tribeca Film Festival.

Lee is a vice-chair of the Unicode Emoji Subcommittee, which is responsible for making recommendations relating to emoji to the Unicode Technical Committee. Inspired by the universality of the dumpling across cultures and cuisines (e.g., jiaozi in China, ravioli in Italy, pierogi in Poland, empanadas in various Latin American countries), she helped to make the dumpling emoji a candidate. She also co-authored the proposal for a hijab emoji.

Early life and education 
Lee was born on March 15, 1976, in New York City, to immigrants from Kinmen, a group of islands off the coast of China's Fujian province governed by Taiwan. Lee was not given a middle name at birth so she chose "8." when she was a teenager. In Chinese culture, the number eight symbolizes prosperity and good luck. She graduated from Hunter College High School in Manhattan in 1994. Lee graduated from Harvard College in Cambridge, Massachusetts in 1999 with a degree in applied mathematics and economics.

Career
While a student at Harvard, Lee was the vice president of The Harvard Crimson student newspaper. She interned at The Washington Post, The Wall Street Journal, The Boston Globe, Newsday, and The New York Times during college. She joined the Times in 2001.

Published in 2008, Lee wrote a book about the history of Chinese food in the United States and around the world, titled The Fortune Cookie Chronicles, documenting the process on her blog. Warner Books editor Jonathan Karp struck a deal with Lee to write a book about "how Chinese food is more all-American than apple pie." She appeared on The Colbert Report to promote the book. The book was #26 on the New York Times Best Seller list.

In December 2009, Lee accepted a buyout from The New York Times.

Lee attempted to popularize the term "man date" in a 2005 New York Times article, which subsequently inspired the 2009 film I Love You, Man starring Paul Rudd.

Lee has served on the advisory panel for the John S. and James L. Knight Foundation's "News Challenge", and has assisted the whistleblowing site WikiLeaks dealing with publicity. She helped the organization with its April 2010 release of a video showing the July 12, 2007, Baghdad airstrike. Lee serves on the board of directors of the Center for Public Integrity, the advisory board of the Nieman Foundation, and the Asian American Writers' Workshop. She is also an advisor to Upworthy.

In 2011, Lee and fellow writer Yael Goldstein Love founded a literary studio named Plympton, Inc. The studio focuses on publishing serialized fiction for digital platforms. Investors include Reddit co-founder Alexis Ohanian, Y Combinator partner Garry Tan, Delicious founder Joshua Schachter, Hipmunk founder Adam Goldstein, Inkling founder Matt MacInnis, Columbia Law Professor Tim Wu (author of “The Master Switch”), Quora co-founder Charlie Cheever, and Tony Hsieh’s Vegas Tech Fund. Its first series launched in September 2012 as part of the Kindle Serials program. Its app Rooster, launched in March 2014, is a mobile reading service for iOS7.

In 2012, Lee created NewsDiffs, a website that archives article revisions from The New York Times, CNN, Politico, The Washington Post, and the BBC, with two brothers who were programmers, MIT graduate student Eric Price and Tddium employee Greg Price. They built the website in 38 hours (including sleep) during the June 16–17, 2012, Knight-Mozilla-M.I.T. hackathon at the MIT Media Lab.

She is a producer for the documentary Artificial Gamer.

See also

 Chinese Americans in New York City
 New Yorkers in journalism
 Taiwanese Americans in New York City

References

External links

New York Times archive of Lee's articles
Plympton official website

1976 births
American women writers of Chinese descent
American writers of Taiwanese descent
Harvard College alumni
Hunter College High School alumni
Living people
People involved with Unicode
The New York Times writers
21st-century American journalists
American women journalists
American journalists of Chinese descent
21st-century American women writers
Journalists from New York City